Gao Xiaozhen (fl. 543–550) was a Chinese official from Eastern Wei.

He was a son of Gao Qianzhi and a grandson of Gao Chong. Gao Chong was also a grandson of the king of Northern Liang Juqu Mujian. His father Gao Qianzhi composed a history of Northern Liang and the Juqu clan, compiling ten volumes of the Liang Shu. 

He joined the military of Wei during the years of the Wuding era (543–550), holding the posts of Situ Shicaocanjun.

References

6th-century births
6th-century Chinese people
6th-century Chinese military personnel
Northern Wei people
Xiongnu